Laura Mvula ( Douglas; born 23 April 1986) is a British singer. A native of Birmingham, England, Mvula has gained experience as a young member or leader of a cappella, jazz/neo-soul and gospel groups and choirs. She was classically trained. In 2012, she signed with RCA Records and released an extended play, She, to critical acclaim.

Mvula released her debut studio album, Sing to the Moon (2013), to favourable reviews, and earning two MOBO awards and a Mercury Prize nomination. In 2014, an orchestral re-recording of the album with the Metropole Orkest was released. Her second album, The Dreaming Room (2016), was also received with critical acclaim, and won the Ivor Novello award and garnered a Mercury Prize nomination. Mvula then wrote the music for the 2017 theatre production of Antony & Cleopatra by the Royal Shakespeare Company. While working on her third album, she released the 1/f EP in February 2021.

In 2018, Mvula received an honorary doctorate of music from her alma mater, Birmingham City University.

Early and personal life
Laura Mvula grew up in the Birmingham suburbs of Selly Park and Kings Heath with two younger siblings. Her mother is a humanities professor and is from Saint Kitts. Her father is from Jamaica and is a youth legal protection educator. She took up piano and violin at primary school and later attended Swanshurst School for girls. In her teens, she sang with Black Voices, an a cappella group set up by her aunt Carol Pemberton; in 2005 they toured Italy and other countries. In 2008, Mvula formed a jazz/neo-soul group called Judyshouse, singing lead vocals and writing material for the band. She was Director of the Lichfield Community Gospel Choir, founded by Black Voices and Lichfield Festival in 2009. She has also previously directed the Alvechurch Community Choir in Alvechurch.

In 2008 Mvula graduated from Royal Birmingham Conservatoire with a degree in composition. She worked as a supply music teacher, and later as a receptionist for the City of Birmingham Symphony Orchestra, when she began to write songs. Her sketches caught the attention of composer Steve Brown, and his manager, Kwame Kwaten, who also became Mvula's manager. In a 2013 podcast for The Daily Telegraph, she admitted to suffering from "crippling stage fright".

Career

2012–2015: Sing to the Moon

In May 2012, after several showcases, Laura Mvula was signed by Colin Barlow to Sony subsidiary RCA. She released her debut extended play, She, on 16 November 2012. The title track is the first song she ever wrote. On 6 December, she was shortlisted for the Critics' Choice award at the 2013 BRIT Awards. On 9 December, she was nominated for the BBC's Sound of 2013 poll and later finished in fourth position. On 1 February 2013, she gave her first live TV performance on The Graham Norton Show on BBC One, singing "Green Garden".

Her debut studio album, Sing to the Moon, was released on 4 March 2013. She worked on the album with producer Steve Brown and mix engineer Tom Elmhirst. It was preceded by the single "Green Garden", an elegy to her home in Kings Heath. Paul Lester from The Guardian described her music as "gospeldelia", calling it a new musical genre. The album was met with a largely positive reception, receiving a perfect score from The Independent, and 3.5/5 from Rolling Stone. It reached number 9 on the UK Albums Chart and within the top 100 in seven other countries, and reached 173 on the US Billboard 200.

Mvula won awards for Best Female Act and Best R&B or Soul Artist at the 2013 MOBO awards, which took place in October. She was also nominated for two Brit awards, Sing to the Moon was shortlisted for a Mercury Prize, and during 2013–14, she garnered over a dozen award-nominations in different categories altogether. The same year, she recorded a cover of the popular 1935's song "Little Girl Blue", which ended up being part of original soundtrack for the 2013 acclaimed film 12 Years A Slave. The track was produced by Troy Miller as their first collaboration.

In March 2014, the artist re-recorded an orchestral version of her debut album in collaboration with the Metropole Orkest and conducted by Jules Buckley. This was released on 23 June as a high quality download via Bowers & Wilkins' Society of Sound and on CD on 11 August. On 19 August, she performed with the Metropole Orkest at the Albert Hall as a part of the 2014 BBC Proms Season, supported by Esperanza Spalding and ElectricVocals.

In July 2015, Mvula performed with fifty musicians of the Metropole Orkest at the North Sea Jazz Festival, one of the biggest indoor jazz festivals in the world. The same year, she recorded a track "You Work For Me"; director Guy Ritchie chose it as a part of soundtrack for his 2015 film The Man From U.N.C.L.E., the song's clip was also used in the US trailer of the movie.

2016–2020: The Dreaming Room
In January 2016, Mvula released "Overcome", a collaboration with Nile Rodgers, and the lead single from her forthcoming second studio album, The Dreaming Room. She recorded "Sing to the Moon" with Snarky Puppy for their jazz fusion album Family Dinner - Volume 2, which was released on 12 February. She began promotion for The Dreaming Room by performing "Overcome" on The Graham Norton Show on 29 January and on The Andrew Marr Show on 14 February. On 19 March, Mvula played the first live show of the album at the Jazz Maastricht Festival. On 22 March, she previewed the entire album at the Islington Assembly Hall. On 7 April, the singer released "People" from the album, a collaboration with Wretch 32. On 19 April, she released the second single from The Dreaming Room, "Phenomenal Woman". The third single, "Show Me Love", was released on 27 May.

The Dreaming Room was released on 17 June 2016, and received universal acclaim from music critics. Writing for Exclaim!, Ryan B. Patrick gave the album a rave review, calling it "a subconscious succession of visuals, emotions and ideas - sometimes abstract, sometimes allegorical, but always dredging up something for the conscious mind to ponder. The Dreaming Room is this and more.". This album is more political than her first; the sound, the orchestration and the rhythms more explicitly refer to her Jamaican and Caribbean influences. The song "Phenomenal Woman" is a happy feminist hymn, inspired by the book of poems of the same title by African-American writer and activist Maya Angelou. The Dreaming Room was produced with Troy Miller and the instrumental crew of The London Symphony Orchestra. In the same June, the singer performed on the Glastonbury Pyramid stage for a second time. In July, she performed with Tom Odell in the first UK event for "Global Citizen" and "Chime For Change", at The View from The Shard in London. The evening followed the launch of #SheWill campaign, aimed at breaking down the barriers that prevent millions of girls worldwide from attending school. On 30 October, she appeared on BBC's Strictly Come Dancing singing her fourth single "Ready or Not", the cover of The Delfonics' song, which was released on 4 November. The song was used in 2016 Christmas campaign of House of Fraser.

The album was shortlisted for the 2016 Mercury Prize among others, and in May 2017, won the Ivor Novello award. Mvula was also nominated for four MOBO awards. In January 2017, the artist revealed that she had been dropped by Sony. She composed the music for the 2017 Royal Shakespeare Company production of Antony and Cleopatra, which opened at the Royal Shakespeare Theatre, Stratford-upon-Avon in March and later transferred to the Barbican Centre in November. In April, she presented a Woman's Hour documentary discussing anxiety.

In April 2018, she performed "I Put a Spell on You" as part of BBC One's The Queen's Birthday Party from the Royal Albert Hall in London. The same year, Mvula and Buika were invited by Carlos Santana to collaborate on his band's album Africa Speaks.

Mvula's "Sing to the Moon" was performed at the 2019 BBC Last Night of The Proms. In that year, she was awarded an Honorary Doctorate by her alma mater, Birmingham City University, for her services to music.

2021: Pink Noise
In February 2021, Laura Mvula announced the pending release of new music and a livestream concert on February 24, 2021, titled "Under a Pink Moon". During the live stream, she premiered four new songs taken from her forthcoming album due to be released by Atlantic Records in 2021. The new songs were "Safe Passage", "Conditional", "What Matters" featuring Simon Neil of Biffy Clyro, and "Church Girl". New versions of the songs "Green Garden", "Show Me Love" and "Sing to the Moon" were also performed, which are included on the 1/f EP released the next day. Both Elisa Bray of iNews and Sylvia Unerman of The Upcoming gave the concert five stars 5/5.

The EP released on 25 February includes also a cover of Diana Ross' 1971 hit "I'm Still Waiting". As wrote Nick Levine of BBC America, this mini-album is a "heartening musical comeback" and "showcases an intriguing new direction: Mvula's music is still soulful, but now has balmy '80s beats underpinning her lush melodies. [...] it's a mouthwatering start to her second chapter". Pitchfork's Jessica Kariisa pointed out "daring musicianship".

On 3 March, Mvula released the single "Safe Passage" alongside a video. The second single, "Church Girl", was released on 17 March with details about Mvula's third album, Pink Noise, which was released on 2 July. "Got Me", the third single, was released on 12 May.

Musical influences
When Mvula was a young girl, her great desire was to be a member of the R&B girl group Eternal. In 2013, she said: "I think that is when I really started to pay attention to singing in a different way to the way we did in church". Together with her siblings and encouraged by parents, who personally favoured jazz and traditional gospel, she performed using their garage as a dance studio.

She stated her influences include Nina Simone, Jill Scott, Erykah Badu, Lauryn Hill, Des'ree, Omar, Miles Davis, John Coltrane, Ella Fitzgerald, The Jackson 5, and Diana Ross.

Discography

Studio albums

Live albums

Soundtrack albums

Extended plays

Singles

Promotional singles

Music videos

Guest appearances

Concert tours
Sing to the Moon Tour (2013–2015)
The Dreaming Room Tour (2016–2017)

Awards and nominations

References

Notes

Sources

External links

 
 

1986 births
Living people
21st-century Black British women singers
Alumni of Birmingham City University
Alumni of Birmingham Conservatoire
British contemporary R&B singers
English soul singers
English record producers
Musicians from Birmingham, West Midlands
English people of Jamaican descent
English people of Saint Kitts and Nevis descent
British women record producers
Atlantic Records artists
RCA Records artists